Sant Pere de Camprodon is a Benedictine monastery in Camprodon, Ripollès, Catalonia, Spain. It was declared a Bien de Interés Cultural landmark in 1931.

History
In 1932 the remains of the old monastery, which were in ruins, were demolished.  Only the old monastery church has been preserved.

Architecture and fittings

It was built in the mid-12th century with the only ornamentation being that of the porch, decorated with columns and capitals. Its plan is a Latin cross, with four square apses. The largest of these has the same width as the nave while remaining open to the sides of the transept. The roof of the nave is a pointed arch supported on arches. On the cross plan, the transept rises to the dome which over which exists a bell tower, two stories high. The dome is covered on the outside by an octagonal lantern. The interior contains the remains of the tombs of some of the abbots. In the diocesan museum of Girona are also preserved some of the ancient capitals from the cloister.

Abbots

References

Bibliography
Pladevall, Antoni; Els monestirs catalans, Ediciones Destino, Barcelona, 1970 
Tomàs Bonell, Jordi; Descobrir Catalunya, Premsa catalana, Barcelona, 1994.

External links

 Monestir de Sant Pere de Camprodon - Monestirs de Catalunya 

Benedictine monasteries in Catalonia
Christian monasteries established in the 10th century
Romanesque architecture in Catalonia
Bien de Interés Cultural landmarks in the Province of Girona